The 2004 Vodacom Cup was the 7th edition of this annual domestic cup competition. The Vodacom Cup is played between provincial rugby union teams in South Africa from the Currie Cup Premier and First Divisions.

Competition
There were seven teams participating in the 2004 Vodacom Cup competition and another seven teams participating in the 2004 Vodacom Shield competition. Teams would play all the other teams in their competition once over the course of the season, either at home or away.

Teams received four points for a win and two points for a draw. Bonus points were awarded to teams that score four or more tries in a game, as well as to teams losing a match by seven points or less. Teams were ranked by points, then points difference (points scored less points conceded).

The top two teams in each competition qualified for the semi-finals. In the semi-finals, the teams that finished first in each competition had home advantage against the teams that finished fourth and the teams that finished second in each competition had home advantage against the teams that finished third. The winners of these semi-finals then played each other in the final.

All the teams in the Vodacom Shield competition rejoined the Vodacom Cup competition for 2005.

Teams

Changes from 2003
 got relegated from the Vodacom Cup to the Vodacom Shield.
 got promoted from the Vodacom Shield to the Vodacom Cup.

Team Listing
The following teams took part in the 2004 Vodacom Cup competitions:

Vodacom Cup

Table

Results

Round one

Round two

Round three

Round four

Round Five

Round Six

Round Seven

Semi-finals

Final

Winners

Vodacom Shield

Table

Results

Round one

Round two

Round three

Round four

Round Five

Round Six

Round Seven

Semi-finals

Final

Winners

References

Vodacom Cup
2004 in South African rugby union
2004 rugby union tournaments for clubs